Lorenzo Alocén Castan (4 November 1937 – 18 January 2022) was a Spanish basketball player. He competed in the men's tournament at the 1968 Summer Olympics. Alocén died on 18 January 2022, at the age of 84.

References

External links
 

1937 births
2022 deaths
Spanish men's basketball players
Olympic basketball players of Spain
Basketball players at the 1968 Summer Olympics
Sportspeople from Zaragoza